Mullingar is a civil parish in County Westmeath, Ireland. It includes Mullingar the county town of Westmeath, as well as the eponymous townland. It is served by Mullingar railway station on the Dublin to Sligo line. The Royal Canal also passes through the parish and the town.

Lough Ennell lies to the south of Mullingar, Lough Owel to the north.

Mullingar is one of 3 civil parishes in the barony of Moyashel and Magheradernon in the Province of Leinster. Parts of the parish (Cartronganny, Clownstown, part of Plodstown and Russellstown) are in the neighbouring barony of Fartullagh.

The neighbouring civil parishes are: Portnashangan (barony of Corkaree) to the north, Rathconnell to the north‑east,
Killucan (barony of Farbill) to the east, Lynn (barony of Fartullagh) to the south‑east and south, Dysart and Churchtown (barony of Rathconrath) to the south‑west, Rathconrath (Rathconrath) to the west and Templeoran (barony of Moygoish) and Portloman (Corkaree) to the north‑west.

Townlands
Mullingar civil parish comprises 63 townlands: Ardivaghan, Ardmore, Balgarrett, Ballagh, Balleagny, Ballina, Ballinderry, Ballyglass, Ballynaclin, Balnamona (or Charlestown), Baltrasna, Bellmount (or Curristown), Bellview, Boardstown, Brockagh, Brottonstown, Brottonstown Little, Cartron, Cartronganny, Clondardis, Clongawny, Clonmore, Clownstown, Commons, Culleen Beg, Culleen More, Drumloose, Farranfolliot, Farranistick, Farranshock (or Rathgowan), Glascarn, Grange North, Grange South, Habsborough, Hanstown, Hopestown, Irishtown, Keoltown, Kilpatrick, Knockdrin Demesne, Ladestown, Marlinstown, Marlinstown Bog, Mullingar, Newtown, Petitswood, Plodstown, Quarry, Rathcolman, Robinstown (Levinge), Robinstown (Tyrrell), Russellstown, Sarsanstown, Slanestown, Spittlefield (or Springfield), Srahenry, Stokestown, Strattonstown, Tuitestown, Tullaghan, Walshestown North, Walshestown South and Windtown.

References

Civil parishes of County Westmeath